Althea Murphy-Price is an American artist who specializes in printmaking, and Professor of Art at University of Tennessee at Knoxville. Her work "contemplates the power of hair as a signifier of cultural self-identity."

Early life 
Murphy-Price was born in California.

Education 
Murphy-Price earned her B.A. in Studio Fine Arts from Spelman College in 2001. In 2003, she earned an M.A. in Painting and Printmaking from Purdue University. Murphy-Price earned an MFA in Printmaking from the Tyler School of Art at Temple University in 2005.

Career 
Murphy-Price has served as assistant professor in printmaking at the Hope School of Fine Arts at Indiana University and at the University of Tennessee, Knoxville.

Technique 
Murphy-Price's signature technique is the creating prints by using synthetic hair extensions as the lines in her work. Her technique is profiled in Beth Grabowski and Bill Fick's Printmaking: A Complete Guide to Materials and Process.

Murphy-Price uses both hair and hair accessories to create sculpture and installations, as well. Hair Rug No. 2 involved the artist dusting synthetic hair on the floor over lace overlay to create a striking rug-like pattern.

Exhibitions and collections 
Murphy-Price has participated in solo and small-group exhibitions including:
 "Supplemental Ornament," Weston Art Gallery, Cincinnati, 2008–2009.
 “Salon Time: Sonya Clark + Althea Murphy-Price + Nontsikelelo Mutiti,” at Union for Contemporary Art in Omaha
 Minthorne Gallery at George Fox University
 "Unreal Expectation," at E. Bronson Ingram Studio Arts Center, Vanderbilt University
 "Hair on Fire" at Halsey Institute of Contemporary Art at The College of Charleston
 "Superficial Details: Althea Murphy Price" at the Turchin Center for the Visual Arts at Appalachian State University

She has been an artist-in-residence at the Frank Lloyd Wright School, University of Hawaii, Hilo, and The Vermont Studio Center.

Murphy-Price's works can be found in the collections of University of Akron, Gallery Collections in Akron, OH; Kohler Library, University of Wisconsin in Madison, WI; Tyler School of Art Archives in Philadelphia, PA; Woodruff Library, Atlanta University Center in Atlanta, GA, among others.

References

Further reading 
 Interview, Locate Arts, 2016.

University of Tennessee faculty
Living people
American women printmakers
20th-century American women artists
21st-century American women artists
Year of birth missing (living people)
American women academics